Darius Kinnard Garland (born January 26, 2000) is an American professional basketball player for the Cleveland Cavaliers of the National Basketball Association (NBA). He played college basketball for the Vanderbilt Commodores.

Born in Gary, Indiana, Garland is the son of former professional basketball player Winston Garland. Garland attended Brentwood Academy in high school, joining the varsity basketball team in eighth grade and leaving as a four-time state champion and three-time Tennessee Mr. Basketball winner. He was a five-star recruit, ranked among the best point guards in the 2018 class, and a McDonald's All-American.

Garland committed to Vanderbilt as the best recruit in program history. After five games, his college career was cut short by a meniscus injury, which prompted him to leave the team to prepare for the NBA draft. After scrutiny in his first season due to perceived disappointing play, Garland was named to his first NBA All-Star Game in 2022, and finished third in voting for the NBA's Most Improved Player award the same year.

Early life
Garland was born in Gary, Indiana, to Felicia Garland and former NBA player Winston Garland. He grew up playing baseball and started basketball at age five but soon narrowed down his focus to only the latter sport. Garland continued with basketball in elementary school and scored his first basket in second grade. In third grade, he attended basketball camps in Valparaiso, Indiana led by Bryce Drew, who would become his college coach at Vanderbilt. Garland played on a travel team against older opponents and joined an Amateur Athletic Union (AAU) squad based in Nashville, Tennessee when he was in fourth grade, because none of the local teams met his standards. After he completed sixth grade, his family moved to Tennessee so that he could attend Brentwood Academy in Brentwood, Tennessee with his AAU teammates Gavin Schoenwald and Camron Johnson. Garland's father described, "We had always talked about relocating. My mother had lived in Tennessee and she liked it. I just talked to the family and everybody was on board. It was a big leap of faith."

High school career
Garland joined the starting lineup for the Brentwood Academy varsity basketball team while in eighth grade. In his freshman season, he averaged 17 points, 1.3 rebounds, and 2.7 assists per game, leading his team to a Tennessee Secondary School Athletic Association (TSSAA) Division II-AA state championship. Garland was one of three finalists for Tennessee Mr. Basketball among Division II-AA players. On December 23, 2015, as a sophomore, he claimed most valuable player (MVP) honors at the King of the Bluegrass Holiday Classic, after scoring 23 points versus Fairdale High School in the title game. Garland averaged 18.6 points and 4.3 assists per game and earned TSSAA Division II-AA Mr. Basketball accolades. High school sports website MaxPreps also included him in its Sophomore All-American Team honorable mention. From his sophomore to junior year, he grew 2½ inches, and by his fourth season with Brentwood Academy, he was ranked the best point guard in the 2018 class by recruiting service 247Sports.

In March 2017, Garland garnered Naismith Trophy High School All-America honorable mention recognition. He averaged 23.4 points, 3.9 rebounds and 2.1 steals per game and led his team to a 30–2 record and state championship. Garland additionally earned MaxPreps Junior All-American first team distinction. On November 13, 2017, he committed to play college basketball for Vanderbilt, drawn there by its proximity to his home and head coach Bryce Drew. Entering his senior season, Garland appeared in the USA Today All-USA preseason team. He averaged 27.6 points, 5.0 rebounds, 4.3 assists and 1.7 steals and secured a fourth straight state title for Brentwood Academy, tying the TSSAA record. Garland joined the MaxPreps High School All-American third team and became the only player other than Brandan Wright to win Tennessee Mr. Basketball on three occasions. In March 2018, he was named Gatorade Tennessee Player of the Year and a semifinalist for the Naismith Trophy. On March 28, Garland recorded a game-high 11 assists at the 2018 McDonald's All-American Game. He took part in the Jordan Brand Classic and Nike Hoop Summit as well.

College career
Garland entered the 2018–19 season as the best recruit to ever sign with Vanderbilt. He was the only freshman in the Southeastern Conference (SEC) to make the preseason all-conference team. On November 6, 2018, in his first college game against Winthrop, Garland led all scorers with 24 points. In a 79–70 win over Liberty on November 19, he scored a season-high 33 points, the second-most points by a freshman in school history. Garland injured his knee during a layup versus Kent State on November 23 and left the game early. Four days later, Vanderbilt head coach Bryce Drew revealed that Garland would be sidelined for the remainder of the season with a meniscus injury. On January 22, 2019, he announced that he would leave Vanderbilt to recover from his injury and prepare for the 2019 NBA draft. Garland later became one of 77 total invitees to take part in the NBA Draft Combine. However, he left the event early on May 15, with the notion that he got promised a selection by a team in the NBA draft lottery.

Professional career

Cleveland Cavaliers (2019–present)

Early years (2019–2021) 

Garland was selected with the fifth pick by the Cleveland Cavaliers in the 2019 NBA draft. On July 3, 2019, he signed his rookie scale contract with the Cavaliers. On October 23, 2019, Garland made his debut in NBA, starting in an 85–94 loss to the Orlando Magic with eight points, two rebounds, five assists and a steal. Garland made history during this game by becoming the first player born in the 2000s to make his NBA debut. On November 22, he scored a season-high 23 points, alongside four assists, in a 101–143 loss to the Dallas Mavericks. During his rookie season, Garland was often ranked amongst the NBA's worst players. He finished his rookie season averaging 12.3 points and 3.9 assists per game. Garland was excluded from both of the season-end NBA All-Rookie teams.

On December 23, 2020, Garland made his season debut for the Cavaliers, recording 22 points, six rebounds and six assists in a 121–114 win over the Charlotte Hornets. On April 5, 2021, he scored a then career-high 37 points, along with seven assists in a 125–101 win over the San Antonio Spurs. Despite the Cavaliers missing the playoffs for a third straight season, Garland averaged 17.4 points per game, alongside 6.1 assists and 1.2 steals.

First All-Star selection (2021–present) 
On January 12, 2022, Garland recorded his first career triple-double, putting up 11 points, 10 rebounds, and a then career-high 15 assists, in a 111–91 win over the Utah Jazz. On January 15, Garland recorded 27 points and a career-high 18 assists in a 107–102 win over the Oklahoma City Thunder. On February 3, he was selected to his first NBA All-Star Game as a reserve. On March 8, Garland scored a then career-high 41 points with 13 assists in a 127–124 win against the Indiana Pacers. On April 12, Garland scored a team-leading 34 points in a 115–108 NBA Play-In Tournament loss to the Brooklyn Nets. The following game, Garland and the Cavaliers lost to the Atlanta Hawks, meaning that despite doubling their previous season’s win total from 22 to 44 and finishing with the eighth best record in the eastern conference, they would not advance to the postseason. Garland later finished third, behind Ja Morant and Dejounte Murray, in voting for the Most Improved Player award.

On July 9, 2022, Garland signed a five-year, $231M designated rookie extension with the Cavaliers. On November 13, he scored a career-high 51 points, with 27 points scored in the fourth quarter, including a personal record 10-of-15 three-point shots in a 129–124 loss to the Minnesota Timberwolves. He became the fourth Cavaliers player to score 50, joining LeBron James (nine times), Kyrie Irving (twice) and Walt Wesley (once). His ten 3-pointers doubled his previous single-game high and were one short of Irving's team record. On November 18, Garland led the Cavaliers to a double-overtime 132–122 win against the Charlotte Hornets with a game-leading 41 points.

Career statistics

NBA

Regular season

|-
| style="text-align:left;"|
| style="text-align:left;"|Cleveland
| 59 || 59 || 30.9 || .401 || .355 || .875 || 1.9 || 3.9 || .7 || .1 || 12.3
|-
| style="text-align:left;"|
| style="text-align:left;"|Cleveland
| 54 || 50 || 33.1 || .451 || .395 || .848 || 3.4 || 6.1 || 1.2 || .1 || 17.4
|-
| style="text-align:left;"|
| style="text-align:left;"|Cleveland
| 68 || 68 || 35.7 || .462 || .383 || .892 || 3.3 || 8.6 || 1.3 || .1 || 21.7
|- class="sortbottom"
| style="text-align:center;" colspan="2"|Career
| 181 || 177 || 33.4 || .443 || .378 || .876 || 2.6 || 6.3 || 1.1 || .1 || 17.4
|- class="sortbottom"
| style="text-align:center;" colspan="2"|All-Star
| 1 || 0 || 24.0 || .417 || .429 ||  || 1.0 || 3.0 || 2.0 || .0 || 13.0

College

|-
| style="text-align:left;"| 2018–19
| style="text-align:left;"| Vanderbilt
| 5 || 5 || 27.8 || .537 || .478 || .880 || 7.8 || 5.6 || 1.8 || .6 || 16.2

Personal life
Garland's father Winston Garland played college basketball for Missouri State before spending seven seasons in the National Basketball Association (NBA). He later became a recreational leader at the Indiana State Prison and coach for West Side Leadership Academy in Gary. Both of Garland's grandfathers served in the United States Army. He has an older sister and four older brothers.

References

External links
USA Basketball bio

2000 births
Living people
African-American basketball players
American men's basketball players
Basketball players from Gary, Indiana
Basketball players from Nashville, Tennessee
Cleveland Cavaliers draft picks
Cleveland Cavaliers players
McDonald's High School All-Americans
Point guards
Vanderbilt Commodores men's basketball players